Amanjot Bhupinder Kaur (born 1 January 2000) is an Indian cricketer who currently plays for Punjab. She plays as a right-arm medium bowler and right-handed batter. She made her debut for India in January 2023, scoring unbeated 41 in a Player of the Match performance against South Africa. She previously played for Chandigarh.

In the inaugral WPL auction in February 2023, Kaur was purchased by Mumbai Indians franchise at 50 lakhs.

References

External links
 
 

2000 births
Living people
People from Chandigarh
Indian women cricketers
India women Twenty20 International cricketers
Punjab, India women cricketers
Chandigarh women cricketers
Mumbai Indians (WPL) cricketers